Our Miss Brooks is a 1956 American comedy film based on the radio and TV sitcom hit on CBS of the same name. Directed by Al Lewis, who was the chief writer for the radio and TV editions, and written by both him and Joseph Quillan, the movie disregarded the past four years of television and started with a new storyline.

Plot
Unmarried, sarcastic English literature and grammar teacher Connie Brooks (Eve Arden) arrives in a small Midwestern town to teach at the local high school. She meets handsome, athletic biology teacher Phillip Boynton (Robert Rockwell), and they begin dating. Boynton, however, is unwilling to commit to the relationship, and several years of platonic dating pass (to Miss Brooks' consternation).

When student Gary Nolan (Nick Adams) does poorly in her class, his father—wealthy local newspaper publisher Lawrence Nolan (Don Porter)—accuses Miss Brooks of being incompetent. Brooks convinces Mr. Nolan that he's working too hard and neglecting his son. Mr. Nolan hires Miss Brooks to tutor his son in English, and agrees to spend more time with Gary. As Gary becomes a better-adjusted youth, Mr. Nolan begins to romance Miss Brooks.

Meanwhile, high school principal Osgood Conklin (Gale Gordon) is criticized by Superintendent Stone (Joseph Kearns) for being a martinet. Conklin decides to seek election to Stone's job, and convinces Miss Brooks to manage his campaign. Miss Brooks convinces Nolan to support Conklin in his newspaper. This gives Nolan more time to romance Miss Brooks, causing Boynton to become jealous. Boyton's jealousy convinces Miss Brooks that he does love her after all, and she breaks off her budding romance with Mr. Nolan.

Conklin seems on the verge of defeating Stone in the next election, but withdraws from the race after learning how little the job pays. Miss Brooks overhears one half of a telephone conversation in which Boynton buys a home and tells the real estate broker that he will be sharing it with "Mrs. Boynton." Miss Brooks assumes that Boynton will soon ask her to marry him, and that he is buying the property as a home for them. But it turns out that Boynton is buying it for himself and his mother, whose loneliness is causing her to have psychosomatic illnesses.  But everything turns out all right once Mrs. Boynton realizes how this is going to impact her son's relationship with Miss Brooks.  She moves in with Miss Brooks' eccentric landlady, Mrs. Margaret Davis (Jane Morgan), instead.

As the film ends, Boynton finally proposes to Miss Brooks and gives her an engagement ring (which is promptly stolen by a chimpanzee at the zoo).

Cast

 Eve Arden as Connie Brooks
 Gale Gordon as Osgood Conklin
 Don Porter	as Lawrence Nolan
 Robert Rockwell as Phillip Boynton
 Jane Morgan as Margaret Davis
 Richard Crenna as Walter Denton
 Nick Adams as Gary Nolan
 Leonard Smith as Stretch Snodgrass
 Gloria McMillan as Harriet Conklin
 Joseph Kearns as Superintendent Stone
 William Newell as Dr. Henley
 Philip Van Zandt as Mr. Webster
 Marjorie Bennett as Mrs. J. Boynton
 Joseph Forte as Nolan's butler
 June Blair as Miss Lonelyhearts

See also
 List of American films of 1956

References

External links
 
 
 
 
 

1956 films
1956 comedy films
American comedy films
American high school films
American black-and-white films
Films scored by Roy Webb
Films about educators
Films based on radio series
Films based on television series
Warner Bros. films
1950s English-language films
1950s American films